Gisele Khoury (born 1961) is a Lebanese-French journalist and talk show host on BBC Arabic. Her show is called Al Mashhad where she interviews prominent figures and high-profile guests from the Arab World. She is the widow of Samir Kassir.

Early life
Gisele Azzi was born in Beirut, originally from Okaibe, Keserwan District. She studied History at the Holy Spirit University of Kaslik, and Media at the Lebanese University.

Career
She started her career in late 1985 on LBC Channel as a presenter of cultural talk shows. She joined the pan-Arab media group MBC in 2002 and contributed to the launch of the 24-hour Al-Arabiya news channel. She hosted a weekly political talk show on Al-Arabiya from the 2003–2013 duration.

During the time Khoury worked on the political show Bil Arabi, part of Al Arabiya news channel, she hosted political decision makers, heads of states, prime ministers and ministers of foreign affairs. 
The show covered current events and the latest political developments from the Arab world and beyond. 
In 2009, Gisèle co-founded “Al Rawi” production company whose first project was a four-episode biography of the Palestinian leader Yasser Arafat.

BBC Arabic
In 2013, Gisele Khoury has been hired by BBC Arabic and to present the programme, "The Scene" (Al Mash’had), that part of new programmes scheduled by BBC Arabic. It began its launch in early 2014.
Produced by Mona Hamdan in Lebanon, (Al MaMsh’had) brings into focus some of the most compelling eyewitness accounts of recent history in the Middle East. Khoury travels to different countries to meet with predominant Arab and international figures and hear their accounts of events that have shaped history.

Personal life
Gisele was married at age 20 to doctor Elie Khoury, whom she kept his last name.

Later on, Khoury was married to journalist, writer and historian Samir Kassir until his assassination on June 2, 2005. Since her husband's death, Gisele Khoury has been active in promoting Kassir's thoughts and with the help of friends and family, she founded the Samir Kassir foundation and the SKeyes centre for media and cultural freedom. She has a son, Marwan, and a daughter, Rana, from her first marriage.

Honours
 French Order of Chevalier of Legion of Honour.

Footnotes

1961 births
Living people
Lebanese television presenters
Lebanese women television presenters
Eastern Orthodox Christians from Lebanon
People from Beirut
Lebanese journalists
Lebanese women journalists
Holy Spirit University of Kaslik alumni
Lebanese University alumni